This is the discography of New Zealand-born classical crossover singer Hayley Westenra.

Westenra is a Christchurch, New Zealand soprano, classical crossover artist.

Solo studio albums

Compilations and other albums

DVDs

with Celtic Woman

Singles and EPs

Singles

EPs

Contributions

References

 
Westenra, Hayley